Kimiko Date-Krumm and Chanelle Scheepers were the defending champions but chose not to participate this year.
Ashleigh Barty and Casey Dellacqua won the title, defeating Tatiana Búa and Daniela Seguel in the final, 4–6, 7–5, [10–4].

Seeds

Draw

Draw

External links
 Main draw

Internationaux de Strasbourgandnbsp;- Doubles
2014 Doubles
2014 in French tennis